Bakerville is an unincorporated community located in the town of Lincoln, Wood County, Wisconsin, United States.

History
A post office was in operation at Bakerville from 1879 until 1900. The community was named after James H. Baker, a local landowner.

Images

References

Unincorporated communities in Wood County, Wisconsin
Unincorporated communities in Wisconsin